The D3 motorway is a highway in the Czech Republic. Currently only the middle segment of the route is in operation; when complete, it will run from Prague via Tábor and České Budějovice to the Czech-Austrian border at Dolní Dvořiště. It is part of the European route E55.

The D3 motorway in the South Bohemian Region towards the Austrian border should be completed by 2025. Completion of D3 in the Central Bohemian Region is planned by 2028, however its designed course through the Lower Sázava landscape is still objected and opposed by environmental and citizens associations.

Course 
Once completed, the  highway will connect the Czech capital Prague with the Austrian Mühlviertel Expressway (S10) to Linz. As of December 2019 only  of the highway are in operation, a section from Mezno to Úsilné (near to České Budějovice), while a further  from Úsilné to Kaplice are currently under construction. The most controversial and disputed section is the planned segment in the Central Bohemian Region.

A  section from Dolní Třebonín to the border with Austria on the other side of the future S10 expressway was initially planned to be built as an expressway as well, however on 1 January 2016, the category of expressways (R) was abolished in Czechia, so it is counted as part of the D3 motorway.

Unfinished sections

Images

References 

D03
Proposed roads in the Czech Republic